Rahul Banerjee (born 15 December 1986) is an Indian Olympic and Arjuna Awardee archer.

Career
Banerjee started archery at the age of thirteen. His sister Dola Banerjee is also an Olympic archer. His first international appearance was in Youth World Championship in 2004; he won a team silver medal, which was the first world level medal for Indian archers. He won several gold medals at the World Cups in 2008, 2009 and 2010, as well as an individual gold medal in the Asian Grand Prix in 2009–2010. At the 2010 Commonwealth Games in Delhi, he won a gold medal in the individual recurve event and he is the First Indian Archer to win gold at CWG and a team bronze medal. He won a team bronze at 2010 Asian Games.He has represented India at more than 50 international competitions including 1 Olympic Games, 2 Asian Games, 3 World Championship, 3 Asian Championship, 8 World Cups, 10 Asian Grand Prix, 2 SAF Games, 1 Commonwealth Games and many more.  He was member of the Indian Archery team which was ranked No. 1 in the world in August 2010.
Rahul Banerjee was world ranking no.6 in Individual category in November 2008

On 21 June 2012, Banerjee qualified for the London Olympics by finishing second in the final qualification meet at Ogden, Utah, United States. At the Olympics he finished 17th individually and 9th with the Indian team.
He was awarded the Arjuna Award in 2011 by the Indian government for his outstanding contribution in the field of archery. He was honored by KHEL SAMMAN & KOLKATA SHRI AWARD by WB STATE GOVT.  He has been appraised with SHERA BANGALI AWARD by the esteemed media house ABP ANANDA

Awards and recognition 

Banerjee received the Arjuna Award in 2011.
He was honored by KHEL SAMMAN & KOLKATA SHRI AWARD by West Bengal State Government.

Family 
Rahul Banerjee married to Madhubanti Bhattacharjee in January 2017 and the couple have a baby girl Bannvi, born Feb, 2020.

References

1986 births
Living people
Indian male archers
Commonwealth Games bronze medallists for India
Archers from Kolkata
Commonwealth Games gold medallists for India
Asian Games medalists in archery
Olympic archers of India
Archers at the 2012 Summer Olympics
Recipients of the Arjuna Award
Archers at the 2010 Asian Games
Archers at the 2014 Asian Games
Asian Games bronze medalists for India
Commonwealth Games medallists in archery
Medalists at the 2010 Asian Games
People from Baranagar
Archers at the 2010 Commonwealth Games
Medallists at the 2010 Commonwealth Games